Kyle Hamilton (born March 16, 2001) is an American football safety for the Baltimore Ravens of the National Football League (NFL). He was born in Greece while his father, Derrick Hamilton, played European league basketball.

Hamilton played college football at Notre Dame, where he was named a consensus All-American in 2021 before being drafted by the Ravens in the first round of the 2022 NFL Draft.

Early years
The son of professional basketball player Derrick Hamilton, Hamilton was born in Heraklion, capital of the Greek island of Crete, on March 16, 2001. He briefly lived in Russia before moving to the Atlanta area after his father retired from the sport. Hamilton attended the Marist School in Brookhaven, Georgia, where he played safety and wide receiver for their football team. He played in the 2019 All-American Bowl. He committed to the University of Notre Dame to play college football.

College career
Hamilton played in 13 games as a freshman with one start and recorded 41 tackles, four interceptions and a touchdown. He was named a Freshman All-American by the Football Writers Association of America. Hamilton took over as a starter as a sophomore in 2020 and was named first-team All-ACC after recording 63 tackles, six pass breakups, and an interception.

Statistics

Professional career

Hamilton declared for the 2022 NFL Draft following the 2021 season, where he was considered by some to be its best prospect. He was selected by the Baltimore Ravens in the first round (14th overall) of the 2022 NFL Draft. He signed his rookie contract on June 7, 2022.

NFL career statistics

Podcast
In July 2021, Hamilton, along with Notre Dame teammates Cam Hart, Conor Ratigan, and KJ Wallace, launched a podcast Inside The Garage.

References

External links
Baltimore Ravens bio
Notre Dame Fighting Irish bio

2001 births
Living people
All-American college football players
American football safeties
Notre Dame Fighting Irish football players
Players of American football from Atlanta
American podcasters
Baltimore Ravens players